St. Sebastian or the Sebastiankirche is a neo-Gothic parish church and state monument on Gartenplatz in Berlin-Gesundbrunnen. It was built between 1890 and 1893 to have capacity for 1000 seats or 3000 standing. It now has a seated capacity of 600 and its parish shares it with the Croatian-speaking community of Berlin.

Sebastian
Buildings and structures in Mitte
Gothic Revival church buildings in Germany
1893 establishments